Dakota (also known as Harley) is a 1988 American drama film starring Lou Diamond Phillips and directed by Fred Holmes.

The film was reedited and rereleased under a different title in 1991, Harley.

Plot
Dakota (Lou Diamond Phillips) is a troubled teenager on the run who takes a job at a Texas ranch to work off his debts. While Dakota restores an antique car, he becomes a pseudo big brother for the rancher's young son, Casey, who lost his leg to cancer. Dakota also begins to fall for the rancher's daughter, Molly.

Cast
 Lou Diamond Phillips as John Dakota
 DeeDee Norton as Molly Lechner
 Herta Ware as Aunt Zard
 Eli Cummins as Walt Lechner
 Jordan Burton as Casey Lechner
 Steve Ruge as Bo Sandoval
 John Hawkes as "Rooster"
 Tom Campitelli as Rob Diamond
 Leslie Mullin as Cynthia Diamond
 Lawrence Montaigne as Mr. Diamond
 Connie Coit as Mrs. Diamond
 Susan Crippin as Alicia
 Robert Lemus as Eric Dakota
 Ben Jones as Mr. Dakota
 Cecilia Flores as Mrs. Dakota
 Rodger Boyce as Sheriff
 Kendall Thomas as Sheriff's Deputy
 Helena Humann as Gym Teacher
 Robert Ahola as The Mechanic
 Speed Ames as Arm Wrestler #1
 David Harrod as Arm Wrestler #2
 Lujenna Moseley as Bo's Girlfriend #1
 Robin Sloan as Bo's Girlfriend #2
 Michelle McHone as Girl In High Heels

Soundtrack
An original score soundtrack for the film was released by CCM singer Chris Christian entitled No Lyrics released in 1988 on Home Sweet Home Records.

References

External links

1988 films
1988 drama films
Films shot in Texas
Films set in Texas
American independent films
Films about Christianity
1988 directorial debut films
1988 independent films
1980s English-language films
Films directed by Fred Holmes
1980s American films